Synergy University Dubai Campus is a branch campus of Synergy University (Russian: Университет Синергия) or Moscow University for Industry and Finance “Synergy” (Russian: Московский финансово-промышленный университет «Синергия») based in Dubai.

Synergy University is one of the largest universities in Eastern Europe with 35000+ students, 40 regional units & wide international representation in different countries of the world, including United Arab Emirates and Russian Federation.

Licensed by The Federal Education and Science Supervision Agency (Ministry of Education and Science of the Russian Federation), Synergy University’s MA & MBA Programs are internationally accredited by the Association of MBA’s (AMBA, UK).

It is the 1st Russian university accredited by the Association of MBAs (AMBA) and granted a certificate of Unique Quality Label issued by the European Foundation for Quality in e-Learning.

The university has representative offices in London, Beijing, Singapore and fully fetched campus in Dubai (United Arab Emirates). Internationally, Synergy University is developing its collaboration with foreign universities and foundations in the field of joint educational programs and providing funds for design and scientific activities of undergraduates. And its international efforts are supported by its international advisory board.

Furthermore, Synergy University sponsors its proprietary Business Incubator as well as manages a dedicated Venture Capital Fund “Synergy Innovations” promoting young entrepreneurial minds and technologies.

It runs a in-house TV channel “Synergy TV” in Dubai while maintaining an internal publishing house “Synergy Press”.

History of main campus 

The history of Synergy University goes back to 1995 when “Moscow International Institute of Econometrics, Informatics, Finance and Law” was established in Moscow.

Shortly thereafter, the Institute was renamed into “Moscow Academy of Industry and Finance”.

In 2009 and under the leadership of Dr. Vadim Lobov and Prof. Yury Rubin, a strategic merger between the Academy and “Synergy Business School”, (an institute offering academic and training programs targeting skilled mid to top-level managers since 1988), took place to form Russia’s largest private education provider. The newly formed institution is run under the brand name “Synergy University”

Today Synergy University is Russia’s largest private university, with more than 35,000 students and over 40 regional and international branches and rep-offices across the globe.

Accreditation and recognition 
Synergy University in Dubai also presented as Synergy Business School.

Synergy Business School of Moscow University of Industry & Finance 'Synergy' is one of the top ranked business schools in Russia. Synergy was also one of the first Russian business schools to gain international accreditation by the Association of MBAs. Synergy Business School was established in 1988.

Brilliant teaching staff of Synergy Business School consisting of successful businessmen with academic and MBA degrees, business consultants of the well-known Russian and international companies, distinguished teachers of the leading institutions allows to maintain quality of training up to the world standards of MBA.

Synergy University is licensed and accredited by the following international authorities:
 
The Association of MBAs (AMBA) is the international impartial authority on postgraduate business education, established in 1967 by a small group of business graduates with the aim to raise the profile of business education and the MBA qualification in UK and Europe.

The Government of Dubai’s Knowledge and Human Development Authority (KHDA) is responsible for licensure and quality assurance across the entire education and human development continuum covering schools and higher education institutions in the Emirate of Dubai.

Ministry of Education and Science of Russian Federation. The Accreditation Body of the Federal Service for Supervision in the Sphere of Education and Science of the Russian Federation conferred the status of university, which leads the institution to the highest level of development and allows it to considerably expand the range of education programs.

The Magna Charta Observatory of Fundamental University Values and Rights is a non-profit organisation, founded by the University of Bologna and the European University Association (EUA).

IAU International Association of Universities (IAU) is the UNESCO-based worldwide association of higher education institutions.

EFQUEL is a European membership organisation. It shares experience of how technology enhanced learning can be used to strengthen individual, organisational, local and regional development, digital and learning literacy, and promote social cohesion and personal development.

Dubai Campus 
The Dubai Campus of Synergy University is located in Jumeirah Lakes Towers (JLT) – one of the business and residential areas of Dubai in Platinum Tower, Cluster I.

The admission office is located in Jumeirah Lakes Towers, Cluster I, Platinum Tower, 32 floor.

This 2014 intake Synergy University is offering several programs such as bachelor's degree in Global Economy, Hotel and Restaurant Management, Information Technologies and Systems and Masters in Hotel and Restaurant Management, Masters in Global Economy, Masters in Retail Management, MBA Women's Leadership and Executive MBA Leadership and Strategy. Programs are licensed by local authority of Dubai - KHDA

Degree programs in Dubai 
Undergraduate
  Bachelor in Hotel and Restaurant Management 
  Bachelor in Global Economy
  Bachelor in Information Systems and Technologies
  Bachelor in Entrepreneurship

Postgraduate
  Masters in Global Economy
  Masters in Hotel and Restaurant Management
  Masters in Retail Management
  Masters in Business Administration (MBA) Women's Leadership
  Masters in Business Administration (MBA) Leadership and Strategy

Language courses 
Synergy University Dubai Campus have the following list of language courses:
 English
 Russian
 Arabic
 Chinese
 Japanese

References

External links
 Official Website of Synergy University Dubai Campus
 aMBA accreditation

Universities and colleges in Dubai
2012 establishments in the United Arab Emirates
Educational institutions established in 2012

ru:Московский финансово-промышленный университет «Синергия»